Swinton is a small village in the Scottish Borders.

History
Swinton dates to the 11th century or earlier, and is associated with the Swinton family, who took their name from the settlement.  In 1769, the village was re-designed and a market was created, now marked by the market cross. A parish church was built and still stands today. In the churchyard, the Swintons have their own burial enclosure. In 1843, the Free Church of Swinton was built, but in the 1900s the spire was removed and it became the local village hall.

The main parish church was remodelled in 1910 by Robert Lorimer.

Notable people
Daniel Laidlaw, recipient of the Victoria Cross

Etymology 
The name of the village is a contraction of Swine Town, a name borne from the large number of wild boar the land was once inhabited by.

Swinton House
It was built to replace an earlier house, which was destroyed by fire in the late 18th century. Both the house and the nearby 18th century dovecote are protected as category A listed buildings.

References

Villages in the Scottish Borders